"Moments in Love" is a song performed by Art of Noise and written by Anne Dudley, Trevor Horn, J. J. Jeczalik, Gary Langan, and Paul Morley.

Formats and track listing
UK 7-inch single 
 "Moments in Love (7'' Single Version)" – 4:40
 "Beat Box (Diversion Ten)" – 3:58

UK 12-inch single (Moments in Love: The Art of Noise's Love Beat) 
 "Moments in Love (Beaten)" – 7:00
 "Moments in Love (7" Single Version)" – 4:40
 "Beatbox (Diversion Ten)" – 3:58
 "Love Beat" – 5:15

US 12-inch single 
 "Moments in Love (Beaten)" – 7:00
 "Moments in Love (7" Single Version)" – 4:40
 "Beatbox (Diversion Ten)" – 3:58
 "Love Beat" – 5:15

UK cassette (The Tortoise and the Hare) 
 "Moments in Love" – 8:37
 "Moments in Love (Beaten)" – 5:33
 "Love Beat" – 5:15
 "Beat Box (Diversion Ten)" – 3:58
Tracks 1–3 are edits unique to the cassette release.

Charts

Weekly charts

Year-end charts

References

External links

Art of Noise songs
1983 songs
Songs written by Anne Dudley
Songs written by Trevor Horn
Songs written by Lol Creme